Dusheti is a town in Georgia, the administrative center of Dusheti Municipality, in the Mtskheta-Mtianeti region, 54 km northeast of the nation's capital of Tbilisi.

History
Dusheti is on both banks of the small, mountainous Dushetis-Khevi River in the foothills of the Greater Caucasus range at an elevation of 900 m. It functions as the center of the Dusheti Municipality which, beyond the town itself, includes several villages of the historical community of Pkhovi, (Pshavi, and Khevsureti). As of the 2014 all-Georgia census, the town had a population of about 6,167.

Dusheti first appears in Georgian written records in 1215. In the 17th century, it served as a residence of the local mountainous lords – the dukes of Aragvi – whose defiance to the Georgian crown more than once led to invasions and devastation of the town by the royal troops. After the abolition of the duchy of Aragvi in the 1740s, Dusheti passed to the crown but significantly declined. In 1801, the Russians took over and granted Dusheti a town status. Next year, it became the center of Dusheti uezd. The town and its environs were a scene of disturbances during the Russian Revolution of 1905, the peasants’ revolt in 1918, and an armed clash during the 1924 August Uprising against the Soviet rule. Dusheti was a center of agriculture and light industry during the Soviet era, but suffered an economic decline and population decrease in the years following the disintegration of the Soviet Union. Nowadays, most people work in service industries (banking, education, auto-repair, and retail) as well as subsistence farming. The town is also known for its khinkali, a meat-filled dumpling very popular in Georgia.

Transport
Dusheti has access by a paved road to the highway connecting Tbilisi and Stepantsminda. There is a regular bus traffic between Dusheti and Tbilisi.

Culture and recreation
There are several historical and recreational places in and around Dusheti such as the Ananuri castle and the Bazaleti Lake. The town itself houses a number of architectural monuments including the 9th-10th-century church of St. George and the 18th-century palace of the Chilashvili family.

Climate

Notable people
Shota Khinchagashvili - a retired Georgian football player.

References

Cities and towns in Mtskheta-Mtianeti
Tiflis Governorate